The Mission sui iuris of Turkmenistan is a Roman Catholic (Latin Church) mission sui iuris (pre-diocesan jurisdiction) for the Catholics of Turkmenistan.

It is exempt, i.e. directly subject to the Holy See (not part of any ecclesiastical province) and has its headquarters in the Turkmen capital Aşgabat, but no see.

History 
On 29 September 1997, the Holy See established the Mission sui iuris on territory split off from the then Apostolic Administration of Kazakhstan (shortly after promoted to Diocese of Karaganda, after missions sui iuris were also split off for Kyrgyzstan, Tadjikistan and Uzbekistan, all in 1997).

Ecclesiastical superiors 
 Father Andrzej Madej, Missionary Oblates of Mary Immaculate (O.M.I.) (September 29, 1997–present)

1997 establishments in Turkmenistan
Missions sui iuris
Roman Catholic dioceses in Turkmenistan